Ready is the sixth studio album released by Tamaki Nami. The album was released in two version: a CD+DVD Limited Edition and a CD Only Edition. The album includes the single previously released, Missing You: Time To Love. The song "Missing You: Time to Love" is a Japanese remake/cover of the Korean song "TTL (Time to Love)", originally released by T-ara and Supernova; the song features original lyrics and a similar tune to the original version of the song. The song "Good-bye" is a Japanese remake/cover of the Korean song "Bye Bye" also by T-ara.

Track listing

References 

2011 albums
Nami Tamaki albums
Universal Music Japan albums